Events in the year 1903 in Bulgaria.

Incumbents

Events 

 19 October – The People's Party, which won 134 of the 169 seats in the parliament following parliamentary elections. Voter turnout was 41.2%.

References 

 
1900s in Bulgaria
Years of the 20th century in Bulgaria
Bulgaria
Bulgaria